The 1986 New Hampshire gubernatorial election took place on November 4, 1986. Incumbent Governor John Sununu was re-elected to a third term in office, defeating Paul McEachern, who had defeated Paul M. Gagnon for the Democratic nomination.

Election results

References

See also

New Hampshire
1986
Gubernatorial